The Gambia Committee on Traditional Practices Affecting the Health of Women and Children (GAMCOTRAP) is a Gambian NGO established in 1984. It campaigns against female genital mutilation, and aims to promote and secure health and empowerment for women through community education.

References

1984 establishments in Africa
Medical and health organisations based in the Gambia
Women's rights organizations
Organizations established in 1984